In a Perfect World is the debut studio album by Irish rock band Kodaline. The album was released in Ireland on 14 June 2013 and includes the singles "High Hopes" and "Love Like This". On 20 June 2013 the album entered the Irish Albums Chart at number 1.

Critical reception

In A Perfect World received generally mixed reviews from critics. The album currently has a score of 47 out of 100 on aggregate review site Metacritic, based on 9 reviews, indicating "mixed or average reviews".

Lewis Corner of Digital Spy gave the album a mixed review, saying that "Each track nods to the album's namesake by being acutely aware of unobtainable aspirations, but accepting the stark reality nonetheless. [...] In A Perfect World is packed with enough heart and soul to make it an enjoyable debut." Caroline Sullivan of The Guardian also gave the album a mixed review stating "Kodaline have already mastered the craft of piling chorus upon unshakable chorus. Most of these 11 songs contain a killer hook, such as the one that transforms High Hopes from wobbly-lipped ballad to hair-tearing tearjerker. [...] All told, there's a lot of bodice-ripping emotion to take in, and it's this, rather than the lack of original ideas, that makes In a Perfect World hard to take in large doses."

Ally Carnwath of The Observer gave the album 2 stars out of 5, and felt "That for all their stadium uplift and notionally anthemic choruses, they never deliver a hook or melodic sucker punch that really floors you." Lauren Murphy of The Irish Times gave a similar review, saying "Kodaline are a bit drab...It sounds like [they] are more focused on ticking boxes in order to appeal to their target audience, than on blazing their own trail by attempting something original." Bevis Man from DIY gave a negative review, saying "Let’s be frank here, what this band needs is a punch in the face and to grow some balls. It’s hard not to imagine the band, all still in their 20s, writing the album wistfully looking out of a window and feeling incredibly sorry for themselves." Q Magazine were highly critical of the album, calling it "Entirely meritless", and awarded 1 star out of 5.

Singles
 "High Hopes" was released as the single from the album on 15 March 2013. The song has peaked to number 1 on the Irish Singles Chart and number 16 on the UK Singles Chart and 13 in Scotland, the song has also charted in Belgium and the Netherlands.
 "Love Like This" was released as the second single from the album on 31 May 2013. The song has peaked to number 8 on the Irish Singles Chart and number 22 on the UK Singles Chart and 19 in Scotland.
 "Brand New Day" was released as the third single from the album on 23 August 2013. The song has peaked to number 29 on the Irish Singles Chart and number 75 on the UK Singles Chart.

Track listing
All tracks are written by Steve Garrigan, Mark Prendergast & Vinny May

Personnel
 Steve Garrigan - lead vocals, rhythm guitar, harmonica, keyboards
 Mark Prendergast - lead guitar, backing vocals, keyboards
 Vinny May - drums, percussion, backing vocals
 Jason Boland - bass guitar, backing vocals

Charts

Weekly charts

Year-end charts

Certifications

Release history

References

2013 debut albums
Kodaline albums
B-Unique Records albums
RCA Victor albums
European Border Breakers Award-winning albums